Philippe Darniche (born 23 February 1943) is a French politician, and a former member of the Senate of France.  He represented the Vendée départment in the Pays de la Loire region, and is a member of the Movement for France party.

References
Page on the Senate website

1943 births
Living people
French Senators of the Fifth Republic
Movement for France politicians
Senators of Vendée
Place of birth missing (living people)